

Events

January events 
 January 28 – Construction of the Waimea Plains Railway, the first railway constructed under the District Railways Act of 1878, reaches Inverrcagill, New Zealand.

February events 
 February 10 – The Pittsburgh and Lake Erie Railway begins freight operations.

May events
 May – James J. Hill forms the St. Paul, Minneapolis and Manitoba Railway from the assets of the bankrupt St. Paul and Pacific.
 May 17 – The Texas and St. Louis Railway, a predecessor of St. Louis Southwestern Railway, is organized as a way to ship cotton south to Texas.
 May 31 – The first electric railway opens at the Berlin Trades Exposition.

July events 
 July 4 – The Atchison, Topeka and Santa Fe Railroad, building southwestward from Kansas, reaches Las Vegas, New Mexico. 
 July 17 – Freycinet Plan enacted in France to extend rail and other transportation systems.
 July 31 – The Caledonian Railway opens the original Glasgow Central station in Scotland.

November events 
 November 1 – The first British dining car service leaves Leeds for London King's Cross. This is provided by the Pullman car Princess of Wales which accommodates just 10 first-class passengers.
 November 20 – Narrow gauge Sandy River Railroad completed to Phillips, Maine.
 November 22 – The North Pennsylvania Railroad begins operating the Philadelphia, Newtown and New York Railroad, a subsidiary of Pennsylvania Railroad.
 November 25 – The Waldenburgerbahn is founded as a separate company and takes over the concession for the railway from Liestal to Waldenburg, Switzerland.

December events 
 December 1 – Solano, the largest rail ferryboat ever constructed, is put into service in California.
 December 28 – Tay Bridge disaster: The North British Railway's Tay Bridge across the Firth of Tay in Scotland collapses in a violent storm while a passenger train is crossing it. 75 lives are lost. William Topaz McGonagall produces his epic poem The Tay Bridge Disaster to commemorate the event.

Unknown date events
 Southern Pacific Railroad engineers experiment with the first oil-fired steam locomotives.
 San Francisco and North Pacific Railroad constructs the Puerto Suello Hill Tunnel in Marin County, California.

Births

March births 
 March 6 – Patrick H. Joyce, president Chicago Great Western Railway 1931–1946 (d. 1946).

April births
 April 24 – Oris Paxton Van Sweringen, American financier who, with his brother Mantis, controls the Nickel Plate Road and other eastern railroads (d. 1936).

August births
 August 20 – Ralph Budd, president of the Great Northern Railway 1919–1932 and Chicago, Burlington and Quincy Railroad 1932–1949 (d. 1962).

October births 
 October 18 – Charles Eugene Denney, president of Erie Railroad 1929–1939 and Northern Pacific Railway 1939–1950 (d. 1965).

Deaths

References
 (2000), American Experience / Streamliners / People & Events / Ralph Budd. Retrieved February 22, 2005.
 President and Fellows of Harvard College (2004), 20th century great American business leaders – Ralph Budd. Retrieved February 22, 2005.
 Today in Science History: May 31. Retrieved May 27, 2005.